Pimenta is a Portuguese surname. People with the surname include:

 Adhemar Pimenta (1896-1970), Brazilian football manager
 Adriano Pimenta (born 1982), Brazilian footballer
 Edmilson Gonçalves Pimenta (born 1971), Brazilian footballer
 Emanuel Eduardo Pimenta Vieira Silva (born 1985), Portuguese sprinter
 Emanuel Dimas de Melo Pimenta (born 1957), artist
 Euclides Rodriguez Pimenta da Cunha (1866-1909), Brazilian journalist, sociologist and engineer
 Fernando Pimenta (born 1989), Portuguese sprint kayaker
 João Pimenta (born 1985), Portuguese football player
 José Pimenta (born 1899), footballer
 Joaquim Pimenta de Castro (1846-1918), Portuguese military officer and politician
 Leonardo André Pimenta Faria (born 1982), Brazilian footballer
 Rui Costa Pimenta (born 1957), Brazilian Communist politician
 Simon Pimenta (1920-2013), Roman Catholic Cardinal and Archbishop 

Portuguese-language surnames